ATM Amin is a retired General of the Bangladesh Army. He is a former Director General of Forces Intelligence, and a former Director General of Ansar and VDP. He was forced into retirement in 2009.

Career
As Brigadier General he was director of counter-terrorism unit Counter Terrorism and Intelligence Bureau of the DGFI . Later he was promoted to Major General and appointed DG of DGFI. It is stated that under him the DGFI tried to create Islamic Democratic Party (IDP) in Bangladesh composed of members of Harakat ul-Jihad-Islami-Bangladesh and that he pressured former Prime Minister Sheikh Hasina to convince the US government to support the party. In the past after the 2005 Dhaka Grenade attack he was accused and framed as helping one of the suspects escape from Bangladesh with support from DGFI officer Lieutenant Colonel Saiful Islam Joarder and Saiful Islam Duke, the nephew of Prime Minister Khaleda Zia.

Amin flew to the United States soon after the Awami League government came to power. As of 2020, he is a wanted fugitive in Bangladesh after being convicted in the criminal case over the 2004 Dhaka grenade attack.

References

Living people
Bangladesh Army generals
Directors General of the Directorate General of Forces Intelligence
Year of birth missing (living people)